Mohammed Knut Johan Richard Bernström (October 22, 1919 – October 21, 2009) was a former Swedish diplomat, who converted to Islam. He was also a Muslim scholar and translator of the Quran.

As a diplomat, he worked in Spain, France, Soviet Union, United States, Brazil, Colombia, Venezuela and Morocco. He was the Swedish ambassador to Venezuela 1963–1969, Spain 1973–1976 and Morocco 1976–1983.

On his own initiative, he went into pension in 1983, converted to Islam in 1986 and took the name Mohammed.

Works
Koranens budskap
Recitation of Quran in Arabic with Swedish translation by Muhammad Knut

References

External links

 Al-Quran project includes the Qur'an translation of Mohammed Knut Bernström.

Further reading
 "An Interview with: The Former Swedish Ambassador, Knut Burnstrom". Arab Radio and Television. - Television programme posted by the Islamic Education Resource Foundation of the U.S. State of California (Archive)

1919 births
2009 deaths
Swedish Muslims
Translators from Arabic
Translators to Swedish
Quran translators
Ambassadors of Sweden to Venezuela
Ambassadors of Sweden to the Dominican Republic
Ambassadors of Sweden to Haiti
Ambassadors of Sweden to Spain
Ambassadors of Sweden to Morocco
Ambassadors of Sweden to the Gambia
Ambassadors of Sweden to Mauritania
Ambassadors of Sweden to Senegal
20th-century translators
Converts to Islam